Geysztor or Gieysztor - is a Polish coat of arms. It was used by several Szlachta families in the times of the Polish–Lithuanian Commonwealth.

History
Name goes back to the year 1582 and Grand Duchy of Lithuania. There are two branches of the family. One is spelled Geysztor (in the south), the other Gieysztor (in the north). The schism occurred about two hundred years later (when the family started feuding).

Blazon
The Red field (warrior or martyr; military strength and magnanimity) means that the forefather was elevated to dukedom in battle (a blue background would have meant for administrative excellence).

Stars represent celestial goodness; noble person; excellence.

Notable bearers
Notable bearers of this coat of arms include:
Aleksander Gieysztor

External links 
  Giejsztor Coat of Arms, altered one and their bearers

See also
 Polish heraldry
 Heraldry
 Coat of arms
 List of Polish nobility coats of arms

Polish coats of arms